Hans Lindbom (born 12 February 1953) is a Swedish football manager. He is the manager of Jönköpings Södra IF.

References

1953 births
Living people
Swedish footballers
Östers IF players
Åtvidabergs FF players
Allsvenskan players
IF Elfsborg managers
Swedish football managers
Husqvarna FF players
IS Halmia players

Association footballers not categorized by position